= Vert Frais =

Restaurant in New York City, U.S.

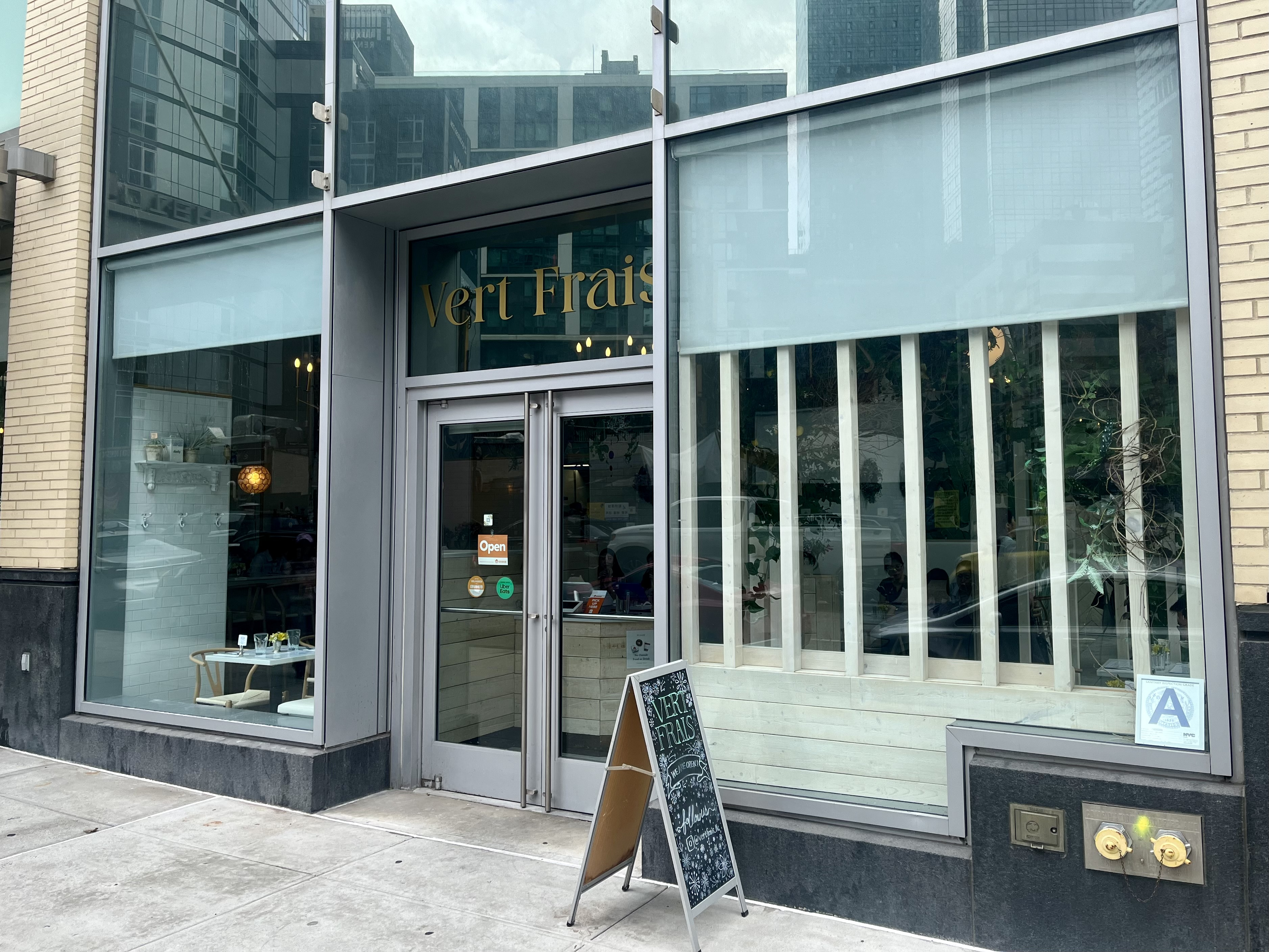
- The restaurant's exterior in 2024
- Interactive map of Vert Frais

Restaurant information
- Established: June 2023
- Location: 43-10 Crescent Street, Long Island City, New York, 11101, United States
- Coordinates: 40°44′56″N 73°56′33″W

Vert Frais is a restaurant in New York City.
